Fremantle, Western Australia was initially incorporated as a Town Trust with limited powers on 17 April 1848. The Municipal Institutions Act 1871 empanelled the Town Council with a Mayor, and it was made a Municipal Council in 1883. On 3 June 1929, Fremantle was declared a city — Western Australia's second after Perth, which was declared in 1856.

Fremantle Town Trust
Summary of Members of the Fremantle Town Trust, 1848-1871.
Compiled from letters to the Colonial Secretary up to 1856, and thereafter from the Minutes of the Fremantle Town Trust.

Town of Fremantle

Summary of Office-bearers of the Fremantle Town Council.
Compiled from the Minutes of the Fremantle Town Council which are intact from 1871-1873

Municipality of Fremantle

Summary of Members of the Fremantle Municipal Council 1883-1929.
Compiled from the Minutes of the Fremantle Municipal Council.

City of Fremantle

Summary of Members of the Fremantle City Council, 1929–present.

References

 
 

Lists of local government leaders in Western Australia
Fremantle-related lists